The flag of Delaware consists of a buff-colored diamond on a field of colonial blue, with the coat of arms of the state of Delaware inside the diamond. Below the diamond, the date December 7, 1787, declares the day on which Delaware became the first state to ratify the United States Constitution. The colors of the flag reflect the colors of the uniform of General George Washington.

The coat of arms in the center of the flag was adopted on January 17, 1777. It depicts a shield of horizontal orange, blue, and white stripes. On the stripes are a sheaf of wheat, an ear of corn, and an ox standing on grass, all representing Delaware's agriculture. Above the shield is a sailing ship. Supporting the shield are a farmer on the left and a soldier on the right. The state motto, below the shield, reads "Liberty and Independence". These symbols are also included on the seal of Delaware.

The current flag was adopted on July 24, 1913.

During the American Civil War, regiments from Delaware flew a flag which was similar to the state coat of arms on a field of blue.

In 2001, a survey conducted by the North American Vexillological Association (NAVA) placed Delaware's flag 52nd in design quality out of the 72 Canadian provincial, U.S. state and U.S. territorial flags ranked.

Laws that enact the flag
The design of the official state flag shall be as follows: A background of colonial blue surrounding a diamond of buff in which diamond is placed the correct coat of arms of the state in the colors prescribed by law and in accordance with §301 of this title, with the words, "December 7, 1787", to be inscribed underneath the diamond.

The official state colors, colonial blue and buff, are designated by the Textile Color Card Association of the United States, Inc., New York, as "arno blue" (Cable No. 10663), and "golden beige" (Cable No. 10781) respectively; the color shades having been determined by Colorimetric Specifications of the National Bureau of Standards, United States Department of Commerce, in Test No. 2, 1/140565, dated November 18, 1954, which is on file with the Delaware Public Archives, Dover, Delaware. The colors of the coat of arms and other elements of the state flag shall be the following: Husbandman, trousers of gray-brown, shirt of red, hat and hilling hoe of brown; rifleman, suit of green, binding, bag and leggings of buff, hat of brown, powder flask and feather of gray; shield, frame of shaded yellow, top panel of orange, center panel of blue, lower panel of white, ox of red-brown, grass and corn of green, wheat and branches underfoot of yellow, heraldic wreath to be blue and silver (twisted); ship under full sail to have a dark hull and white sails; date, December 7, 1787, to be white; cord and tassels to be blue and gold.

Governor's flag
The official flag of the governor of the state shall be identical to the official flag of this state except that it shall also bear a fringe of gold, surrounding the edge of the flag and the pole upon which the governor's flag is carried shall have mounted thereon a model of a blue hen's fighting cock.

See also

State of Delaware
Symbols of the state of Delaware
Great Seal of the State of Delaware

References

Further reading
 Origin and History of the American Flag and of the Naval and Yacht-club Signals, Seals and Arms, and Principal National Songs of the United States, with a Chronicle of the Symbols, Standards, Banners, and Flags of Ancient and Modern Nations, Volume 2, by George Henry Preble, Charles Edward Asnis, 1917
 Delaware Flag: 29 Del. C. 1953, § 506; 50 Del. Laws, c. 288, § 1; 70 Del. Laws, c. 186, § 1; 72 Del. Laws, c. 91, § 10.
 Governor's Flag: 29 Del. C. 1953, § 507; 50 Del. Laws, c. 290, § 1.

External links

Delaware
Symbols of Delaware
Delaware
Delaware